Calliostoma mariae is a species of small sea snail, a marine gastropod mollusc in the family Calliostomatidae.

Distribution
This species is endemic to the Philippines. It is found in Northern Leyte in the Visayas group of islands. This top shell lives at depths of approximately 205 to 214 m.

Shell description
The shell is broadly conical with six slightly convex whorls. It is small for the genus. The shell height is up to 8 mm, and the width is up to 10 mm.

References

External links
 

mariae
Gastropods described in 2006